Stephen Wallace Dorsey (February 28, 1842March 20, 1916) was a Republican politician who represented Arkansas in the United States Senate from 1873 to 1879, during the Reconstruction era.

He was born in Benson in Rutland County, Vermont, and subsequently moved to Ohio and settled in Oberlin, where he attended public schools.

In 1861, he joined the 1st Ohio Light Artillery of the Union Army as a private during the American Civil War. By the end of the war, he became a colonel. After the war he returned to Ohio and settled in Sandusky where he was employed by the Sandusky Tool Company and subsequently became its president. Named president of the Arkansas Railway Company, he relocated to Helena, Arkansas.

He was a U.S. Senator from March 4, 1873, to March 3, 1879 and did not seek reelection, then the domain of the Arkansas General Assembly. He was a chairman of the Committee on District of Columbia (Forty-fifth Congress). In 1876, he was made a member of the Republican National Committee. In 1880, when the Republicans nominated James A. Garfield for U.S. President and Chester A. Arthur for vice president, Dorsey became the secretary of the Republican National Committee. His reputation was tarnished, though, by the Star route scandal, in which Dorsey and his partners were accused of defrauding the government of $412,000. Dorsey was defended by noted criminal law attorney Robert G. Ingersoll. Though he was found not guilty, the cost of his defense and the damage to his reputation all but destroyed Dorsey's political and financial ambitions.

In 1878 he built the Dorsey Mansion in New Mexico.

After Dorsey, no other Republican served as a Senator from Arkansas until Tim Hutchinson in 1997, and no other Republican served in the state's Class 3 Senate seat until John Boozman in 2011.

He  engaged in cattle raising and mining in New Mexico  and Colorado and subsequently moved to Los Angeles, California, where he resided until his death in 1916. He is interred at Fairmount Cemetery in Denver, Colorado.

Clayton in Union County, New Mexico is named, for a son of Senator Dorsey.

See also
List of federal political scandals in the United States

References

1842 births
1916 deaths
People of Vermont in the American Civil War
Politicians from Sandusky, Ohio
Arkansas Republicans
Republican Party United States senators from Arkansas
New Mexico Republicans
California Republicans
Colorado Republicans
Businesspeople from Ohio
Businesspeople from Arkansas
19th-century American politicians
19th-century American businesspeople
Union Army colonels